The Whites' Woods Nature Center is a  nature center in Indiana County, Pennsylvania, USA. It is publicly owned by White Township.

Trees
Whites' Woods contains many trees native to Pennsylvania. Oaks, maples, pines, tulip poplar and magnolias are among the many trees common in this area.

References

External links
 

Nature centers in Pennsylvania
Parks in Indiana County, Pennsylvania
Protected areas of Indiana County, Pennsylvania